Franco Giongo (27 July 1891 in Bologna – 28 December 1981) was an Italian track and field athlete who competed in the 1912 Summer Olympics.

Biography
In 1912 he was eliminated in the semi-finals of the 100 metres competition as well as of the 200 metres event. He also participated in the 400 metres competition and was eliminated in the first round.
One of his granddaughters is the Italian reporter and writer Maria Cristina Giongo.

National titles
Franco Giongo has won 11 times the individual national championship.
5 wins on 100 metres (1910, 1911, 1912, 1914, 1923)
2 wins on 200 metres (1914, 1923)
4 wins on 400 metres (1910, 1911, 1912, 1914)

See also
100 metres winners of Italian Athletics Championships

References

External links
 
 Athletics (Track & Field) 1912 - Italy

1891 births
1981 deaths
Sportspeople from Bologna
Italian male sprinters
Olympic athletes of Italy
Athletes (track and field) at the 1912 Summer Olympics
Italian Athletics Championships winners